Skalberg is a surname of Swedish origin. Notable people with the surname include:

Jens Skålberg (born 1985), Swedish ice hockey player
Oscar Skalberg (1929–2006), Australian rules footballer

See also
Jesper Skalberg Karlsson (born 1993), Swedish politician

Surnames of Swedish origin